Andrei Vasilyevich Bakalets (born 7 January 1972) is a former Russian professional football player.

Club career
He played 3 seasons in the Russian Football National League for FC Torpedo-Viktoriya Nizhny Novgorod and FC Shinnik Yaroslavl.

Honours
 Russian Second Division Zone Povolzhye top scorer: 1998 (31 goals).

References

1972 births
People from Neustrelitz
Living people
Russian footballers
Association football forwards
FC Shinnik Yaroslavl players
FC Irtysh Pavlodar players
FC Sibir Novosibirsk players
FC Luch Vladivostok players
FC Spartak Kostroma players
Kazakhstan Premier League players
Russian expatriate footballers
Expatriate footballers in Kazakhstan
Russian expatriate sportspeople in Kazakhstan
FC Torpedo NN Nizhny Novgorod players
FC Spartak-MZhK Ryazan players